Shala  is a 2011 Marathi drama / romantic film. The screenplay of film is adapted from the a novel of the same name by Milind Bokil. Directed by Sujay Dahake and produced by Vivek Wagh, Nilesh Navalakha under Great Maratha Entertainment, Nishad Audio Visuals and Navalakha Arts Banner, the film stars Anshuman Joshi and Ketaki Mategaonkar in the lead roles.

The film won the Silver Lotus Award at the 59th National Film Awards in the Best Feature Film in Marathi category and National Film Award for Best Screenplay.

Plot
Set in the 70's in rural India, four 9th grade kids were writing their destiny. Joshi (14) is in love with Shirodkar (14), a beautiful girl. Both go to the same school, and study in the same class. faced with the age old question "What is love anyway?", Joshi goes through a series of events just to let the girl know about his feelings towards her. Joshi's friends on the other hand are going through the same phase of life. The difference is all four of them come from a different cultural and family background.

Surya (16) is a typical life lover and a great blend of society and hippie culture. Chitrya (14) a born genius and wants to be a scientist. He comes from a modern family setting and is the smartest one amongst the group. Favdya (15), the poorest, is the dumbest amongst all four. Joshi (14) comes from an average middle-class family, with a confused future.

Joshi wants the girl to know his feelings. He has been trying hard. He attends the same private tuitions as her just to get a glance of her. He follows her to her house everyday without her knowing about this. The story is of struggle, freedom and liberation with a spice of loneliness.

Cast
 Anshuman Joshi as Mukund Joshi
 Ketaki Mategaonkar as Shirodkar
 Dilip Prabhavalkar as Appa
 Santosh Juvekar as Majarekar sir
 Jitendra Joshi as Narumama
 Amruta Khanvilkar as Paranjape Bai
 Devika Daftardar as Bendre bai
 Nandu Madhav as Joshi's Father
 Ashwini Giri as Mukund's Mother
 Vaibhav Mangle as Ponkshe kaka
 Ketan Pawar as Surya(Mhatre)
 Chinmay Kulkarni as K.T.
 Unnati Agarkar as Sukadi
 Omkar Mane as Favdya
 Mukta Vaidya as Kevada
 Suhas Vedpathak as Chitre
 Shruti Velankar as Mande
 Pinak Wadikar as Bibikar
 Snehal Ghayal as Akka 
 Kaumudi Walokar as Anita Ambekar
 Anand ingale
Akshaya Deodhar

Awards

References

External links
 
 Times of India

2011 films
Films scored by Alokananda Dasgupta
Films whose writer won the Best Adapted Screenplay National Film Award
Best Marathi Feature Film National Film Award winners
2010s Marathi-language films